Quiróz is a Spanish surname. The Portuguese version is Queirós.

Alejandro Quiroz, Mexican modern pentathlete
Ana Lilia Guillén Quiroz (born 1955), Mexican politician
Celso Camacho Quiroz, fourth-generation Mexican potter who works in Metepec, Mexico
César Camacho Quiroz (born 1959), Mexican lawyer and politician
Clarita de Quiroz, Scottish singer/songwriter and model of Dutch, Irish, Filipino, Spanish descent
David Quiróz (born 1982), Ecuadorian footballer
Esteban Quiroz (born 1992), Mexican professional baseball infielder
Fernando Quiroz, retired Argentine football midfielder
Francisco Quiroz (1957–1993), former WBA Lightweight champion
Guillermo Quiróz (born 1981), Major League Baseball catcher
Jimmy Quiroz (born 1983), Chilean footballer
Lisa Garcia Quiroz (1961–2018), Hispanic-American business executive at Time Warner
Manuel Jose de Quiroz (died 1765), 18th-century Guatemalan composer
Manuel Juan Robustiano de los Dolores Rodriguez Torices y Quiroz (1788–1816), Neogranadine statesman, lawyer, journalist, Precursor of the Independence of Colombia
María Fernanda Quiroz (born 1986), Mexican actress
María García Quiroz (born 1968), Mexican politician
Pamela Anne Quiroz (born 1960), American sociologist
Roberto Quiroz, Ecuadorian tennis player
Salvador Quiroz (1892–1956), Mexican film actor
Sergio Lorenzo Quiroz (born 1959), Mexican politician
Sergio Quiróz, Mexican footballer
Walter Quiroz (born 1972), Argentine theatre, television and film actor

See also
Queiroz, the Portuguese form of the name
Santiago Pérez Quiroz Airport serving Arauca, Colombia
José Manuel Quiroz District, one of seven districts of the province San Marcos in Peru